Robert L. Ridgeway III is an American politician. He is a former member of the South Carolina House of Representatives from the 64th District, serving from 2012 to 2020. He is a member of the Democratic Party.

References

Living people
1958 births
Republican Party members of the South Carolina House of Representatives
21st-century American politicians